The Church Avenue station is an express station on the BMT Brighton Line of the New York City Subway, located at Church Avenue near East 18th Street in the Flatbush neighborhood of Brooklyn. The station is served by the Q train at all times and by the B train on weekdays only.

History

Early history 
The original station at this location was a two-track side platform station that ran south from Church Avenue, whereas the current station runs to the north. This marks the point where the original Brighton Beach Line transitioned from an open-cut line depressed below ground level to a surface railroad for the remainder of the run to Coney Island. The line south of this point was converted from a two-track surface line to a four-track grade-separated line in 1907, and the portion north of this point was rebuilt from a two-track open cut to a four-track open cut in 1919.

After August 1, 1920, through service was shifted from the current BMT Franklin Avenue Line to a new subway alignment under Flatbush Avenue, which permitted direct access to Manhattan via the Manhattan Bridge and the Montague Street Tunnel.

Renovations 

In 1981, the Metropolitan Transportation Authority (MTA) listed the station among the 69 most deteriorated stations in the subway system. In 1982, the MTA began renovating the station.

In 2019, as part of an initiative to increase the accessibility of the New York City Subway system, the MTA announced that it would install elevators at the Church Avenue station as part of the MTA's 2020–2024 Capital Program. In November 2022, the MTA announced that it would award a $965 million contract for the installation of 21 elevators across eight stations, including Church Avenue. A joint venture of ASTM and Halmar International would construct the elevators under a public-private partnership.

Station layout

Church Avenue is an open-cut express station with short tunnels at each end to carry the line between cross streets. The station has four tracks and two island platforms. Each platform has two staircases, leading to a station-house at each end.

Exits
There are two exits and entrances to the station, both through station houses. The full-time end of the station is at Church Avenue, to the south. The original station-house was demolished and replaced with the current structure. Plain white tiles dot the interior and exterior of this entrance. There are restrooms inside fare control to the right side. The part-time entrance is at the north end of the station by Caton Avenue and St. Pauls Place, and the station-house there retains the original c.1918 exterior. This end of the station originally had a part-time booth during the morning rush; a high-exit turnstile was open at all other times.

After the 1980s renovation, the station was converted to booth operations from 7:00 AM to 10:00 PM every day. All of the platform columns were covered with steel supports during the renovation. At the midpoint, the southbound platform has an abandoned exit to East 18th Street between Church and Caton Avenues. The exterior of the station-house was made with brick and stucco, and was added in the early 1960s. The boarded-up staircase still stands.

See also
 Church Avenue (IRT Nostrand Avenue Line)
 Church Avenue (IND Culver Line)
 Church Avenue Line (surface)
 IND Church Avenue Line

References

External links 

 
 Station Reporter — B Train
 Station Reporter — Q Train
 The Subway Nut — Church Avenue Pictures 
 Church Avenue entrance from Google Maps Street View
 Caton Avenue entrance from Google Maps Street View
 Platform from Google Maps Street View

BMT Brighton Line stations
New York City Subway stations in Brooklyn
Railway stations in the United States opened in 1878
Railway stations in the United States opened in 1907
Flatbush, Brooklyn